Atlingbo Church is a medieval church in Atlingbo on the Swedish island Gotland. Atlingbo Church was built in stages during the 13th century, with only the sacristy being of later date. The church contains a decorated Romanesque baptismal font made by the workshop or sculptor known as Byzantios. It is used by the Church of Sweden and lies in the Diocese of Visby.

History and architecture 
The present church was erected on the site of at least one earlier church; the first church on the site may have been one of the first churches on Gotland as it is mentioned in the Gutasaga. The presently visible church was erected during the 13th century. The oldest parts are the choir and apse, dating from the first part of the century. At the end of the century, the nave and tower base were constructed; the tower was never finished. The sacristy was added in 1800–01. The church has three remaining medieval portals, two Gothic and one Romanesque. In the nave there is unusually a hagioscope. Among the furnishings of the church, the octagonal baptismal font was made during the 12th century, probably by the Romanesque sculptor or workshop known as Byzantios. The altar and pulpit date from the 17th century while the pews are from the 18th century.

The church belongs to the Church of Sweden and lies within the Diocese of Visby.

References

Further reading

External links 

Gothic architecture in Sweden
Churches in Gotland County
Churches in the Diocese of Visby
13th-century churches in Sweden
Churches converted from the Roman Catholic Church to the Church of Sweden